Roman Alexandrovich Karmazin (born January 2, 1973) is a Russian former professional boxer. He held the IBF Light Middleweight title.

Professional career
Karmazin suffered his first loss in 2002, a twelve-round decision against Javier Castillejo of Spain in Castiliejo's hometown. His only draw came early in his career in an eight-round fight against Javier Martinez in Avilés, Spain. Karmazin also has a no-contest against former title contender Jason Papillion. The 2004 bout was halted when Papillion was cut by an accidental headbutt in the fourth round.

In 2004, Karmazin outworked Keith Holmes to a majority decision in an IBF title eliminator.

A consistent puncher, Karmazin won the IBF Light Middleweight championship through steady work that led to a lopsided unanimous decision over Kassim Ouma. On July 8, 2006, nearly a year after his last fight, Karmazin lost his title to Cory Spinks.

Karmazin's corner includes world-class trainer Freddie Roach.

Professional boxing record

See also
List of world light-middleweight boxing champions

References

External links

Official site
Filmed interview 2010-03-19
Quotes 2008-01-14
Article «Roman Karmazin bout is Finest hour» on NYDaylyNews.com 2008-01-08

 

|-

|-

1973 births
Living people
Russian male boxers
People from Kuznetsk
Light-middleweight boxers
Middleweight boxers
World light-middleweight boxing champions
European Boxing Union champions
International Boxing Federation champions
Sportspeople from Penza Oblast